Alanya Castle (Alanya Kalesi) is a medieval castle in the southern Turkish city of Alanya.

History
Most of the castle was built in the 13th century under the Seljuq Sultanate of Rûm following the city's conquest in 1220 by Alaeddin Keykubad I, as part of a building campaign that included the Kızıl Kule.

The castle was built on the remnants of earlier Byzantine era and Roman era fortifications. After the area was pacified under the Ottoman Empire, the castle ceased to be purely defensive, and numerous villas were built inside the walls during the 19th century. Today the building is an open-air museum. Access to the seaward castle is ticketed, but much of the area inside the wall, including the landward castle is open to the general public.

In 2009, city officials filed to include Alanya Castle and Tersane as UNESCO World Heritage Sites, and they were named to the 2009 Tentative List.

References

External links

Go Turkey guide to Alanya Castle
Nomad's Guide to Turkey

Buildings and structures completed in 1226
13th-century fortifications
Alanya
Castles in Turkey
Seljuk castles
Buildings and structures in Antalya Province
Tourist attractions in Antalya Province
Forts in Turkey
Museums in Turkey
Buildings and structures of the Sultanate of Rum
Castles in Antalya Province